, translated Masked Rider ZO, is a 1993 Japanese tokusatsu biopunk superhero movie produced by the Toei Company as part of their Kamen Rider Series. Directed by Keita Amemiya, it was the first joint production of Toei and Bandai. A Sega CD interactive movie was released for ZO in 1994, and was distributed in the United States as The Masked Rider: Kamen Rider ZO.

To commemorate the series' 40th anniversary, ZO was shown on Toei's pay-per-view channel in September 2011. The film's protagonist, Kamen Rider ZO, appears in the later Kamen Rider Decade television series and is a playable character in the 2011 Nintendo DS video game All Kamen Rider: Rider Generation.

Plot
Masaru Aso is the laboratory assistant of geneticist Doctor Mochizuki. He is used in one of Mochizuki's experiments related to the creation of the Neo-Lifeform, enabling him to transform into the grasshopper-like Kamen Rider ZO. He flees to the mountains and lapses into a two-year coma before he is awakened by a telepathic call to protect Hiroshi Mochizuki, the doctor's son. After an attempt to discover the meaning of his transformation at Mochizuki Genetics, Masaru senses that Hiroshi is in danger and saves the boy from Doras as ZO. Masaru then reveals himself to Reiko and her karate class. ZO battles Koumori Man (created by Doras) to cover Hiroshi and Reiko's escape, but they are sucked into a pocket dimension by Kumo Woman (which was also created by Doras). ZO saves them and kills Kumo Woman; Koumori Man snatches Hiroshi, with ZO in pursuit. After he saves Hiroshi, Masaru tells Seikichi (Hiroshi's grandfather) that Mochizuki used him in his experiments. Refusing to believe it, Hiroshi runs off. Masaru finds him and fixes his watch, recognizing the melody which awakened him as he helps Hiroshi cope with the revelation. Koumori Man assumes Mochizuki's form to lure Hiroshi away, and Doras knocks Masaru unconscious. Masaru awakens when a grasshopper shows him where Hiroshi has been taken. Making his way to a complex, ZO kills Koumori Man. He finds Hiroshi and Dr. Mochizuki, learning that the geneticist was the one who woke him up and that the Neo-Lifeform has been acting independently to become a perfect being. When ZO tries to fight Doras, he is absorbed by the Neo-Lifeform and Doras uses Hiroshi to force Mochizuki to complete its evolution. The music from Hiroshi's watch keeps Doras at bay as ZO escapes from the monster, and Mochizuki sacrifices himself to destroy the pool (the Neo-Lifeform's life source). The complex self-destructs as ZO and Hiroshi escape. Leaving the boy with Seikichi, Masaru leaves for parts unknown.

Characters
 : The hero of the story, Masaru was Doctor Mochizuki's assistant until Mochizuki experiments on him, turning Masaru into the grasshopper-themed cyborg Kamen Rider ZO. Although he hates Mochizuki, Masaru eventually forgives him.
 : A young boy who lives with his grandfather, Seikichi, and is targeted by the Neonoid. Hiroshi longs to be with his father, who went missing years ago. As a memento, Doctor Mochizuki gave Hiroshi a pocket watch which plays music. Hiroshi is afraid of ZO at first, but eventually calls him "Brother".
 : A mad scientist who turns Masaru into ZO and creates the Neo-Lifeform. Although he dreams of creating a "perfect lifeform", it turns on him. Mochizuki uses grasshoppers to telepathically contact ZO.
: A pool of living fluid which relies on its container for survival. It assumes the appearance of a deformed, egotistical, unemotional boy resembling Hiroshi. It becomes the grotesque, Kamen Rider-like  to find Hiroshi and force Dr. Mochizuki to complete its evolution into a perfect life form and destroy the human race and its imperfections. Doras can regenerate after injury, absorbing materials to upgrade itself. When Doras absorbs ZO, it becomes .
 : A monster created by Doras, she is a four-legged spider who captures Hiroshi.
 : Another monster created by Doras, he is a black bat-like entity which can disguise itself as a human. As Mochizuki, it lures Hiroshi to its master's hideout.

Cast
 : 
 : 
 : 
 : 
 : 
 : 
 : 
 : 
 :

Production 
The idea for the project was conceived due to the strong sales of Shin Kamen Rider: Prologue, which was released through direct-to-video. Many proposals were planned such as sequel to Shin, or a feature film featuring Ichigo to Black RX. However, it was decided that it would be a standalone film.

Shigeru Okada, then president of Toei Video, Ryonori Watanabe, and Makoto Yamashina, then president of Bandai Visual, proposed a joint project on the condition that it would push box office sales through a multi-million yen campaign. Okada was one of the first to green-light the film. He then collaborated with Yamashina and planned to release the upcoming film by next May. Bandai would refresh their brands to focus on making mass sales while Toei collaborated to develop Kamen Rider World  as part of the promotions.

There were restrictions on producing ZO from within the company, but Okada pulled through and decided to produce the film over a year before its eventual release. In March 1992, the decision to produce the film had begun and an multichannel marketing was deployed for potential box-office sales, such as film, television events, and merchandise sales.

It was planned as a standalone release theatrically because it was an anniversary film. However, due to potential box-office risks, executives created the Toei Super Hero Fair and was shown alongside the theatrical versions of Gosei Sentai Dairanger and Tokusou Robo Janperson. For that reason, ZO's runtime was shortened at 48 minutes than the envisioned 90, causing the film's development to be rushed. It was director Keita Amemiya's idea to shortened the length of the film as if it were a Makunouchi bento.

Production of the film had begun on November 19, 1992. The film had finished principal photography on December 20, 1992, and was officially completed on February 3, 1993.

Songs

ZO vs. J
The S.I.C. Hero Saga story, published in Monthly Hobby Japan magazine from February to May 2005, contained a crossover with Kamen Rider J entitled . In the story, the Neo Organism Doras obtains the Fog Mother's powers.

Adaptations
Kazuhiko Shimamoto drew a manga adaptation of the film. It takes some liberties with the plot, expanding the role of several characters, a different characterization of ZO and more-graphic violence. The manga includes short stories about Kamen Rider Black and Kamen Rider creator Shotaro Ishinomori.

The film was adapted into the video game The Masked Rider: Kamen Rider ZO and released in North America for the Sega CD, despite the film's never airing there. It also features extra footage of scenes not used on the final version of the original film.

Saban Entertainment spliced together footage from Kamen Rider ZO for its Masked Rider TV show, with the monsters used in some episodes. Doras became Destructosphere, and was the first monster sent by series villain Count Dregon in the opening two-part episode "Escape From Edenoi". Kumo Woman became Arachnida, appearing in the episode "Stranger from The North" and with a monster from the sequel Kamen Rider J. Koumori Man became Parasect and appeared in the episode, "Cat-Atomic".

References

External links
 

1993 films
Biopunk films
Films with live action and animation
ZO
Kazuhiko Shimamoto